The Made in Taiwan (frequently depicted as "MIT") is the country of origin label affixed to products to indicate that the said product is made in Taiwan. As the economy of Taiwan increased production, the Made in Taiwan label was applied to products ranging from textiles, plastic toys, and bikes in the 1980s to laptops and computer chips in the 1990s; over 80% of the world's notebook computer design is made in Taiwan. In the 1980s, "Made in Taiwan" became iconic earning Taiwan recognition around the world.

In 1991, the Taiwan External Trade Development Council (TAITRA) commissioned design firm Bright & Associates to improve the quality and image of the Made in Taiwan brand.

In 2010, there was a push by the Ministry of Economic Affairs to promote certified made-in-Taiwan products in Taiwan, including stocking participating items at major chain stores.

See also

 Taiwan Miracle
Made in Indonesia
Made in Japan

References

Taiwan
Industry in Taiwan